Monroeville Vineyard & Winery is a winery in the Monroeville section of Upper Pittsgrove Township in Salem County, New Jersey. The vineyard was first planted in 2010, and opened to the public in 2012. Monroeville has 4 acres of grapes under cultivation, and produces 1,800 cases of wine per year from New Jersey and Chilean grapes. The winery is named for the community where it is located.

Wines
Monroeville Vineyard is in the Outer Coastal Plain AVA, and produces wine from Cabernet Franc, Cabernet Sauvignon, Chardonnay, Concord, Grüner Veltliner, Merlot, Muscat of Alexandria, Pinot gris, and Syrah grapes. Monroeville also makes fruit wines from apples, blueberries, cranberries, nectarines, peaches, strawberries.

Licensing and associations
Monroeville has a plenary winery license from the New Jersey Division of Alcoholic Beverage Control, which allows it to produce an unrestricted amount of wine, operate up to 15 off-premises sales rooms, and ship up to 12 cases per year to consumers in-state or out-of-state. The winery is a member of the Garden State Wine Growers Association and the Outer Coastal Plain Vineyard Association.

See also 
Alcohol laws of New Jersey
American wine
Judgment of Princeton
List of wineries, breweries, and distilleries in New Jersey
New Jersey Farm Winery Act
New Jersey Wine Industry Advisory Council
New Jersey wine

References

External links 
Garden State Wine Growers Association
Outer Coastal Plain Vineyard Association

Upper Pittsgrove Township, New Jersey
Wineries in New Jersey
Tourist attractions in Salem County, New Jersey
2012 establishments in New Jersey